Neilson is a patronymic surname meaning "son of Neil".  The prefix Neil- is of Irish Gaelic origin, a genitive of 'Niall', possibly meaning "Champion" or "Cloud".  Neilson, as a surname, is common in English language-speaking countries, but less common as a given name. It can be an anglicisation of MacNeil (Gaelic: MacNeill) or the Scandinavian name, Nielsen.

People with the name Neilson or its variant spellings include:

Surname
Adelaide Neilson (1847–1880), British actress
Alan Neilson (born 1972), German footballer
Alex Neilson (born 1982), British musician
Anthony Neilson (born 1967), British playwright
Bill Neilson (1925–1989), Australian politician
Brendan Neilson (born 1978), New Zealand-Japanese rugby union player
Charles Neilson (1889–1916), Scottish footballer and teacher
Cook Neilson (born 1943), U.S. journalist and motorcycle racer
David Neilson (born 1949), British actor
Donald Neilson (1936-2011), British criminal
Ed Neilson, American politician
Francis Neilson (1867–1961), British playwright and politician
Harry B. Neilson (1861–1941), British illustrator
Ian Neilson (born 1954), South African engineer and politician
Jackie Neilson (1929-2012), British footballer
James Beaumont Neilson (1792–1865), British inventor
James Neilson (director) (1909-1979), American film and television director
Jim Neilson (born 1941), Canadian ice hockey player
John Neilson (1776–1848), Canadian politician
Julia Neilson (1868–1957), British actress
Kim Nielsen (born 1973), U.S. professional wrestler
Lois Neilson (1895–1990), U.S. silent movie actress
Marjory Newbold née Neilson (1883 - 1926), leading Scottish socialist and communist, prominent in the Independent Labour Party and a 'Red Clydesider' 
Melany Neilson (born 1958), U.S. novelist
Perlita Neilson (1933–2014), English actress
Phyllis Neilson-Terry (1892–1977), British actress
Robbie Neilson (born 1980), British professional football player
Roger Neilson (1934–2003), Canadian hockey coach
Samuel Neilson (1761–1803), Irish political activist
Sandra Neilson (born 1956), U.S. swimmer
Scott Neilson (athlete) (born 1957), Canadian hammer thrower
Scott Neilson (footballer) (born 1987), English footballer
Shane Neilson (born 1975), Canadian physician, author and poet
Shaw Neilson (1872–1942), Australian poet
Susan Bieke Neilson (1956–2006), U.S. judge
Tommy Neilson (1934-2018), British footballer
Walter Montgomerie Neilson (1819–1889), Locomotive builder
Willie Neilson (1873–1960), British Rugby player
William Neilson (1844–1915), Canadian businessman
William Allan Neilson (1869–1946), British-born U.S. educator, writer and lexicographer

Given name
Neilson Hubbard (born 1972), American singer-songwriter, musician and producer.

See also
 Neilsen (disambiguation)
 Nelson (disambiguation)
 Nielsen (surname)
 Nielson
 Nilsen
 :Category:Neilson family
 Nelson (surname)

English-language surnames
Scottish surnames
Masculine given names
Patronymic surnames
Surnames from given names